Donald Paul Roos (born April 14, 1955) is an American screenwriter and film director.

Life and career
Roos was born in upstate New York into a conservative Roman Catholic family of mostly Irish descent. He attended the University of Notre Dame in Indiana. After graduating, Roos moved to Los Angeles, where he pursued a television screenwriting career.

Roos supported himself by working as a word processor, and to this day jokes that he has that as a fall-back plan. Roos began his writing career when he had a friend of his impersonate an agent and represent him; a phone call led to a job with playwright Mart Crowley (The Boys in the Band), who at the time was an executive producer of Hart to Hart. Roos wrote for The Colbys, Nightingales, and other TV shows, before his spec scripts led to feature film writing assignments. His first major film was 1992's Academy Award-nominated Love Field, an interracial drama starring Michelle Pfeiffer and Dennis Haysbert.

Roos's work as the writer of the film Single White Female has earned him a permanent space in Hollywood movie trivia, since that title has entered the lexicon in reference to the film's psychopathic lead character who begins to take on her roommate's identity.

Roos is well known for his work writing strong and engaging female characters, a skill that has also been useful in his film direction, leading to Independent Spirit Award nominations for actors Lisa Kudrow, Christina Ricci and Maggie Gyllenhaal. Roos himself has won a Best First Feature Independent Spirit Award, for The Opposite of Sex. Roos has polished or written the screenplay to many high-profile studio films, sometimes as uncredited script doctor.

With his husband - actor, writer, and film producer Dan Bucatinsky - he has two children, Eliza and Jonah.

Films directed and written
 The Other Woman (2009) (also screenwriter)
 Happy Endings (2005) (also writer)
 Bounce (2000) (also writer)
 The Opposite of Sex (1998) (also writer)

Films written
 The Guernsey Literary and Potato Peel Pie Society (2018) (screenwriter)
 Marley & Me (2008) (screenwriter)
 Diabolique (1996) (writer)
 Boys on the Side (1995) (writer)
 Love Field (1992) (writer)
 Single White Female (1992) (screenwriter)

References

External links
 
 

1955 births
Living people
20th-century American male writers
20th-century American screenwriters
20th-century American LGBT people
21st-century American male writers
21st-century American screenwriters
21st-century American LGBT people
American male screenwriters
American male television writers
American soap opera writers
American television writers
Film directors from New York City
LGBT film directors
American LGBT screenwriters
LGBT people from New York (state)
Screenwriters from New York (state)
Showrunners
University of Notre Dame alumni
Writers from New York City